ACEVO (Association of Chief Executives of Voluntary Organisations) is a membership body for the leaders of third sector organisations in England and Wales. ACEVO has sister organisations in Scotland (acosvo) and Northern Ireland (CO3 Chief Officers 3rd Sector).

Aims
ACEVO's vision is to see civil society leaders making the biggest possible difference. Its stated aims are to connect, develop and represent civil society leaders. In turn, these aims are met by offering professional development and peer learning opportunities; providing informal networking events and tailored advice to all members; and lobbying the UK government on behalf of its members.  These three aims are all intended to make the sector more effective and impactful. ACEVO is a registered charity [number 1114591].

History
ACEVO was started in 1987 by three charity chief executives who felt isolated in their positions, and wanted to establish a networking group of third sector leaders. Its original name was ACENVO – Association of Chief Executives of National Voluntary Organisations – but its membership now encompasses the leaders of charities and not-for-profits from small, community-based groups, ambitious medium-sized organisations, and well known national and international not-for-profits. Current chief executive Vicky Browning took over in 2017 following previous CEOs Sir Stephen Bubb (2000–2016) and Dororthy Dalton (1987–2000). ACEVO celebrated its 30th anniversary in 2017. It has over 1,100 members and a staff of 11 FTE.

Membership
ACEVO's membership is primarily drawn from England and Wales, (third sector leaders in Scotland or Northern Ireland can join ACOSVO or CO3 respectively). Full members are CEOs (or equivalent) at charities and social enterprises. Associate membership is offered to anyone with an interest in sector leadership, including chairs and trustees (but excluding for-profit organisations), and aspiring CEOs join as senior leader members. Private organisations wishing to support and work with the sector may become part of the network as commercial partners.

Membership fees are graduated by the turnover of the organisation the CEO represents.

Members join primarily for peer support and professional development through networking, training and events. Members also benefit from information services, and from legal and emotional support in the event that their job is put at risk. ACEVO also represents the voice and views of civil society leaders to influencers including the government and the media.

Influencing
ACEVO has been influential within the UK in campaigning on behalf of third sector leaders, most notably on issues of governance, leadership and funding. ACEVO is a strategic partner of the Cabinet Office's Office for Civil Society, and has been involved in the government's numerous task forces and working groups.

Together with New Philanthropy Capital, ACEVO developed and pioneered the concept of Full Cost Recovery, which states that third sector organisations should cost their work robustly, and that the funding they receive from government should be sustainable.

Criticism
ACEVO has been criticised by other voluntary sector organisations for taking a political stance in favour of charities assisting with the privatisation of public services such as healthcare and prisons. The National Council for Voluntary Organisations criticised a 2005 ACEVO report warning it could "warp public perception of the role of the sector".

References

External links
 

Charities based in the United Kingdom
Organisations based in the City of London